Robert Coats may refer to:

 Robert R. Coats (1910–1995), American geologist
 Robert H. Coats (1874–1960), Canada's first Dominion Statistician